The list of ship launches in 1683 includes a chronological list of some ships launched in 1683.


References

1683
Ship launches